Ruff Ryders Entertainment is an American hip hop record label and management company founded by siblings and record executives Joaquin "Waah", Darin "Dee" and Chivon Dean. It operated as a subsidiary of Universal, and distributed by Fontana Distribution. The label went on to launch the careers of several successful artists such as DMX, Eve, Drag-On and the Deans' nephew, Swizz Beatz, among others. The Ruff Ryders namesake also referred to a loose-knit hip hop collective composed of the core signees of the label. The collective's de facto leader was the label’s flagship artist DMX.

History

Rise and success

Ruff Ryders began as the managers of DMX and The LOX.

In 1997, through Def Jam A&R Irv Gotti, Def Jam signed Ruff Ryders artist DMX. Following DMX's signing to Def Jam, Ruff Ryders was launched as a record label. DMX's first studio album, It's Dark and Hell is Hot was released on May 12, 1998 and was the first release from Ruff Ryders as a record label. Portion of the album were recorded at Ruff Ryders' main studio, Powerhouse studios. The album featured guest appearances from fellow Ruff Ryders artists Loose and Big Stan, as well as a then 17-year old Drag-On, who signed in 1997.  It also featured production from in-house Ruff Ryders producers P.K. and Dame Grease as well as the Deans' then teenage nephew Swizz Beatz, who was relatively unknown at the time. It's Dark And Hell And Hell Is Hot debuted at number 1 on the Billboard top 200 and sold over 250,000 copies in its first week. The album went on to sell four million copies in America, being certified quadruple platinum by the RIAA, and sold five million copies worldwide. The strong success of the album catapulted Ruff Ryders into mainstream success and prompted Def Jam's leader Lyor Cohen to challenge DMX to record another album quickly to have another album released within the same calendar year. DMX's second studio album, Flesh of My Flesh, Blood of My Blood, was released on December 22, 1998 through Ruff Ryders and debuted at number one the Billboard Top 200. The album sold over 670,000 units in its first week of release, and went on to sell over four million copies. By this time, Ruff Ryders enlisted Jay Jackson and Amelia Moore as A&R coordinators. Dee and Waah remained executive producers and A&Rs, with Dee also being the stylist for the label.

On March 28, 2000, Interscope and Ruff Ryders released Drag-On's debut studio album, Opposite of H2O. The album featured production from Ruff Ryders in house producers P.K./P. Killer Trackz, DJ Shok, Jay "Icepick Jay" Jackson, and Swizz Beatz as well as guest appearances from Ruff Ryders acts Parle, Eve, The LOX, Styles, Jadakiss, and DMX. Supported by the moderately successful lead singleSpit These Bars, the album peaked in the top 5 on the Billboard top 200 and was certified Gold in America. A Parle album, originally scheduled for an April 4, 2000 release, was ultimately shelved.

The label promoted the idea of all its acts being part of the "Ruff Ryders family", as evidenced when DMX won Best Rap Album at the 2000 Billboard Music Awards and was joined on stage by other Ruff Ryders when he went to accept his award. That same year, Ruff Ryders toured with Cash Money Records from February to April.

Decline
In 2003, Ruff Ryders' deal with Interscope Records ended, though Jadakiss, Eve and Styles remained on Interscope. Shortly thereafter, Ruff Ryders signed a joint venture deal with Virgin Records. That same year, Ruff Ryders signed Jin, a Miami, Florida born Chinese rapper who rose to prominence through winning many Freestyle Fridays rap battles on BET's 106 & Park.

The first release from Ruff Ryders under the Virgin deal was Drag-On's second studio album, Hell and Back, released in February 2004. The album featured appearances from Ruff Ryders artists Eve, DMX, Styles, Jadakiss and Swizz Beatz, who also provided production on the album. As a result of low promotion, Hell and Back was a commercial failure, only peaking at number 47 on the Billboard top 200 and failing to achieve gold status in America. Jin's debut album, The Rest Is History, was delayed multiple times before its October 2004 release. Upon release, the album was also a commercial failure, only selling 20,000 units and peaking at number 54 on the Billboard top 200. Contributing factors to the album failing was lack of promotion from Virgin Records and the online music piracy crisis of the 2000s. The failure of both albums led to Ruff Ryders parting ways with Virgin Records.

2005 saw only one release from Ruff Ryders, Vol. 4: The Redemption, released through independent record company Artemis Records. The album peaked at number 40 on the Billboard top 200 and sold around 25,000 copies in its first week. It was the only Ruff Ryders album released through Artemis. That same year, DMX began working on his sixth studio album, then titled Here We Go Again. Though the album was initially scheduled to be release through Def Jam, tension between DMX and then-Def Jam president Jay-Z led to DMX leaving Def Jam. The album, now titled Year of the Dog... Again, was released in August 2006 through Ruff Ryders, Sony Urban Music and Columbia Records. The album debuted at number 2 on the Billboard top 200 but failed to achieve the same success that DMX previously achieved. That same year, Jin left the label as well as Drag-On who left to join Swizz Beatz's Full Surface Records.

Ruff Ryders released Styles P's Super Gangster (Extraordinary Gentleman) in 2007 and Jadakiss's The Last Kiss in 2009 through Interscope Records and Def Jam Recordings, respectively. The Last Kiss is the latest album released through Ruff Ryders, and Ruff Ryders has remained dormant since then due to not having funding and distribution from a record label.

Roster
Artists
Big Stan
Cassidy 
DMX (deceased)
Drag-On
Swizz Beatz
Eve 
Fiend
Infa-Red & Cross
The LOX (Jadakiss, Sheek Louch and Styles P)
MC Jin
Yung Wun
Loose
Parlè

In house producers 
DJ Iroc
DJ Shok
P.K./P. Killer Trackz
Dame Grease
Icepick Jay (deceased)

Marketing staff
Keisha Gibbs
Ignatius "Icepick Jay" Jackson (deceased)

Releases

Studio albums

Compilations

See also
Bloodline Records founded by DMX
D-Block Records founded by the Lox
Full Surface Records founded by Swizz Beatz

References

External links
Official website

Record labels established in 1988
Record labels disestablished in 2010
Defunct record labels of the United States
American record labels
American hip hop record labels
Contemporary R&B record labels
Labels distributed by Universal Music Group
Gangsta rap record labels
Hardcore hip hop record labels
DMX (rapper)